Warriors of the Rainbow Bridge is the eleventh album by American Southern rock band Molly Hatchet, released on May 24, 2005, two months after former singer Danny Joe Brown died from complications of pneumonia. In January 2005, guitarist Bobby Ingram invited Dave Hlubek, one of the original three guitarists, to rejoin Molly Hatchet and in doing so became the only current member who was a part of the original band, and appears on this album.

Track listing

Personnel 
Molly Hatchet
Phil McCormack – lead vocals, harmonica
Bobby Ingram – guitars, acoustic guitar, backing vocals, producer, editor
Dave Hlubek – guitars, backing vocals
John Galvin – keyboards, piano, programming
Tim Lindsey – bass, backing vocals
Shawn Beamer – drums, percussion

Additional musicians
Rich DelFalvo – keyboards, piano

Production
 Nikolo Kotzev – engineer, mixing
 Rainer Hänsel – mixing

References

Molly Hatchet albums
2005 albums
SPV/Steamhammer albums